Lichnanthe rathvoni is a species of bumble bee scarab beetle in the family Glaphyridae. It is found in North America. The species is named for Simon Rathvon, a 19th-century American entomologist.

References

Further reading

 

Glaphyridae
Articles created by Qbugbot
Beetles described in 1863